Discoverer 33, also known as Corona 9026, was an American optical reconnaissance satellite which was lost in a launch failure in 1961. It was the eighth of ten Corona KH-2 satellites, based on the Agena-B.

The launch of Discoverer 33 occurred at 19:23 UTC on 23 October 1961. A Thor DM-21 Agena-B rocket was used, flying from Launch Complex 75-3-5 at the Vandenberg Air Force Base. The launch ended in failure after the Agena suffered a hydraulics system malfunction that led to premature main engine shutdown.

Discoverer 33 was intended to have operated in a low Earth orbit. It would have recorded images onto  film, and returned this in a Satellite Recovery Vehicle at the end of its mission. The Satellite Recovery Vehicle carried by Discoverer 33 was SRV-553.

References

Spacecraft launched in 1961
Satellite launch failures